Björgvin Hermannsson (27 June 1938 – 24 May 2012) was an Icelandic footballer who played as a goalkeeper. He played domestic football with Valur and won one cap for the Iceland national football team, keeping goal in the 3–8 defeat to Belgium on 5 June 1957.

References

External links

1938 births
2012 deaths
Bjorgvin Hermannsson
Association football goalkeepers
Bjorgvin Hermannsson
Bjorgvin Hermannsson